Mackenzie was a provincial electoral district in the Canadian province of British Columbia. It elected one member to the Legislative Assembly of British Columbia. The district was abolished as the result of a redistribution under the Electoral Districts Act, 1990, and replaced with Powell River – Sunshine Coast

Members elected 1969–1987

Election results 1924–1966

|-

|- bgcolor="white"
!align="right" colspan=3|Total valid votes
!align="right"|9386	
!align="right"|100.00%
!align="right"|
|- bgcolor="white"
!align="right" colspan=3|Total rejected ballots
!align="right"|90
!align="right"|
!align="right"|
|- bgcolor="white"
!align="right" colspan=3|Turnout
!align="right"|66.9%
!align="right"|
!align="right"|
|}

|-

|- bgcolor="white"
!align="right" colspan=3|Total valid votes
!align="right"|10,390	
!align="right"|100.00%
!align="right"|
|- bgcolor="white"
!align="right" colspan=3|Total rejected ballots
!align="right"|90
!align="right"|
!align="right"|
|- bgcolor="white"
!align="right" colspan=3|Turnout
!align="right"|67.8%
!align="right"|
!align="right"|
|}

|-

 
|Progressive Conservative
|Moon
|align="right"|487
|align="right"|4.6%
|align="right"|
|align="right"|unknown
|- bgcolor="white"
!align="right" colspan=3|Total valid votes
!align="right"|10,664	
!align="right"|100.00%
!align="right"|
|- bgcolor="white"
!align="right" colspan=3|Total rejected ballots
!align="right"|132
!align="right"|
!align="right"|
|- bgcolor="white"
!align="right" colspan=3|Turnout
!align="right"|66.6%
!align="right"|
!align="right"|
|}

|-
 
|Co-operative Commonwealth Fed.
|Anthony Gargrave
|align="right"|4502
|align="right"|48.4%
|align="right"|
|align="right"|unknown

 
|Progressive Conservative
|Moon
|align="right"|189
|align="right"|2.0%
|align="right"|
|align="right"|unknown
|- bgcolor="white"
!align="right" colspan=3|Total valid votes
!align="right"|9299	
!align="right"|100.00%
!align="right"|
|- bgcolor="white"
!align="right" colspan=3|Total rejected ballots
!align="right"|89
!align="right"|
!align="right"|
|- bgcolor="white"
!align="right" colspan=3|Turnout
!align="right"|63.5%
!align="right"|
!align="right"|
|}

|-

|Co-operative Commonwealth Fed.
|Anthony Gargrave
|align="right"|4468
|align="right"|41.4%
|align="right"|5191
|align="right"|53.6%
|align="right"|
|align="right"|unknown

|Liberal
|B. Milton MacIntyre
|align="right"|3397
|align="right"|31.5% 
|align="right"|4497
|align="right"|46.4% 
|align="right"|
|align="right"|unknown

|Progressive Conservative
|Dawe
|align="right"|230
|align="right"|2.1%
|align="right"|-- 
|align="right"|--.--%
|align="right"|
|align="right"|unknown
|- bgcolor="white"
!align="right" colspan=3|Total valid votes
!align="right"|10,782 	 	 
!align="right"|100.00%
!align="right"|9688 	 
!align="right"|%
!align="right"|
|- bgcolor="white"
!align="right" colspan=3|Total rejected ballots
!align="right"|440
!align="right"|
!align="right"|
|- bgcolor="white"
!align="right" colspan=3|Turnout
!align="right"|72.8%
!align="right"|
!align="right"|
|- bgcolor="white"
!align="right" colspan=9|2Preferential ballot: 1st and 3rd counts of Three shown only) 	
|}

|-

|Co-operative Commonwealth Fed.
|Anthony Gargrave
|align="right"|4230
|align="right"|38.2%
|align="right"|5373
|align="right"|53.5%
|align="right"|
|align="right"|unknown

|Liberal
|B. Milton MacIntyre
|align="right"|3752
|align="right"|33.9% 
|align="right"|4669
|align="right"|46.5% 
|align="right"|
|align="right"|unknown

|Progressive Conservative
|Eckhardt
|align="right"|1285
|align="right"|11.6%
|align="right"|-- 
|align="right"|--.--%
|align="right"|
|align="right"|unknown
|- bgcolor="white"
!align="right" colspan=3|Total valid votes
!align="right"|11,062 	 	 
!align="right"|100.00%
!align="right"|10,042 	 
!align="right"|%
!align="right"|
|- bgcolor="white"
!align="right" colspan=3|Total rejected ballots
!align="right"|347
!align="right"|
!align="right"|
|- bgcolor="white"
!align="right" colspan=3|Turnout
!align="right"|67.1%
!align="right"|
!align="right"|
|- bgcolor="white"
!align="right" colspan=9|2Preferential ballot: 1st and 3rd counts of Three shown only) 	
|}

|-

 
|Co-operative Commonwealth Fed.
|Herbert Gargrave
|align="right"|4626
|align="right"|44.4%
|align="right"|
|align="right"|unknown
|- bgcolor="white"
!align="right" colspan=3|Total valid votes
!align="right"|10,413	
!align="right"|100.00%
!align="right"|
|- bgcolor="white"
!align="right" colspan=3|Total rejected ballots
!align="right"|315
!align="right"|
!align="right"|
|- bgcolor="white"
!align="right" colspan=3|Turnout
!align="right"|77.7%
!align="right"|
!align="right"|
|}

|-
 
|Co-operative Commonwealth Fed.
|Herbert Gargrave
|align="right"|2961
|align="right"|52.3%
|align="right"|
|align="right"|unknown

|- bgcolor="white"
!align="right" colspan=3|Total valid votes
!align="right"|5673	
!align="right"|100.00%
!align="right"|
|- bgcolor="white"
!align="right" colspan=3|Total rejected ballots
!align="right"|315
!align="right"|
!align="right"|
|- bgcolor="white"
!align="right" colspan=3|Turnout
!align="right"|66.7%
!align="right"|
!align="right"|
|}

|-
 
|Co-operative Commonwealth Fed.
|Herbert Gargrave
|align="right"|2909
|align="right"|45.8%
|align="right"|
|align="right"|unknown

|Liberal
|McGeer
|align="right"|2079
|align="right"|32.7%
|align="right"|
|align="right"|unknown

|Conservative
|Young
|align="right"|1370
|align="right"|21.5%
|align="right"|
|align="right"|unknown
|- bgcolor="white"
!align="right" colspan=3|Total valid votes
!align="right"|6358	
!align="right"|100.00%
!align="right"|
|- bgcolor="white"
!align="right" colspan=3|Total rejected ballots
!align="right"|97
!align="right"|
!align="right"|
|- bgcolor="white"
!align="right" colspan=3|Turnout
!align="right"|65.9%
!align="right"|
!align="right"|
|}

|-

|Liberal
|John Melvin Bryan. Sr.
|align="right"|1828
|align="right"|33.9%

|Conservative
|McIntyre
|align="right"|1661
|align="right"|30.8%
 
|Co-operative Commonwealth Fed.
|Herbert Gargrave
|align="right"|1625
|align="right"|30.2%

|- bgcolor="white"
!align="right" colspan=3|Total valid votes
!align="right"|5388	
!align="right"|100.00%
!align="right"|
|- bgcolor="white"
!align="right" colspan=3|Total rejected ballots
!align="right"|315
!align="right"|
!align="right"|
|- bgcolor="white"
!align="right" colspan=3|Turnout
!align="right"|70.8%

|-
 
|Co-operative Commonwealth Fed.
|Ernest Bakewell
|align="right"|2071
|align="right"|43.6%
|align="right"|
|align="right"|unknown

|Liberal
|Castillou
|align="right"|1386
|align="right"|29.2%
|align="right"|
|align="right"|unknown

|- bgcolor="white"
!align="right" colspan=3|Total valid votes
!align="right"|4749
!align="right"|100.00%
!align="right"|
|- bgcolor="white"
!align="right" colspan=3|Total rejected ballots
!align="right"|214
!align="right"|
!align="right"|
|- bgcolor="white"
!align="right" colspan=3|Turnout
!align="right"|67.5%
!align="right"|
!align="right"|
|}

|-

|Conservative
|Michael Manson
|align="right"|1266
|align="right"|51.0%
|align="right"|
|align="right"|unknown

|Liberal
|William J. Heath
|align="right"|1215
|align="right"|49.0%
|align="right"|
|align="right"|unknown
|- bgcolor="white"
!align="right" colspan=3|Total valid votes
!align="right"|2481
!align="right"|100.00%
!align="right"|
|- bgcolor="white"
!align="right" colspan=3|Total rejected ballots
!align="right"|51
!align="right"|
!align="right"|
|- bgcolor="white"
!align="right" colspan=3|Turnout
!align="right"|65.1%
!align="right"|
!align="right"|
|}

|-

|Conservative
|Michael Manson
|align="right"|742
|align="right"|41.5%
|align="right"|
|align="right"|unknown

|Liberal
|Duncan G. McKay
|align="right"|647
|align="right"|36.2%
|align="right"|
|align="right"|unknown

|Provincial
|Charles H. Leicester
|align="right"|401
|align="right"|22.4%
|align="right"|
|align="right"|unknown
|- bgcolor="white"
!align="right" colspan=3|Total valid votes
!align="right"|1790
!align="right"|100.00%
!align="right"|
|- bgcolor="white"
!align="right" colspan=3|Total rejected ballots
!align="right"|—
!align="right"|
!align="right"|
|- bgcolor="white"
!align="right" colspan=3|Turnout
!align="right"|55.6%
!align="right"|
!align="right"|
|}

References

Sources
 Elections BC
 SUMMARIES OF PROVINCIAL ELECTIONS AND BY-ELECTIONS, BRITISH COLUMBIA 1928 TO 1969.By: BRITISH COLUMBIA. CHIEF ELECTORAL OFFICER, Published: 1969,  McMaster University Government Publications.

Former provincial electoral districts of British Columbia